The discography of Jars of Clay, a multi-stylistic American rock and Christian band from Nashville, Tennessee consists of 12 studio albums, 44 singles, 16 extended plays, two major compilation albums, a part-studio, part-live double-album, a live DVD, and several releases of other types. While Jars of Clay has never released a major, full-length live album strictly speaking, the second disc of the part-studio, part-live double-album, Furthermore (2003), fulfills the same expectation. In addition, the band has released Live Monsters (2007), a live EP of performances from the tour following the release of Good Monsters (2006), and five more EPs of live performances in smaller, more intimate settings.

Jars of Clay's self-titled debut album (1995) was released on Essential Records as well as on Essential's parent label, Silvertone. The album hit No. 1 on the Billboard Top Christian albums for a total of 22 weeks in 1996.  It reached No. 1 on the Billboard Heatseekers chart and stayed on the Billboard 200 for a total of 66 weeks, peaking at No. 46. Its first single, "Flood" reached No. 12 on the Billboard Modern Rock Tracks, No. 37 on the Billboard Hot 100 and No. 1 one on the CCM Rock chart. The single's performance made Jars of Clay an overnight success in both the mainstream and Christian radio markets. The debut album was certified platinum by RIAA having sold more than 1 million copies just one year following its release. It was certified 2× platinum in 1999.  Two other singles from the album also hit No. 1 on the CCM charts, "Love Song for a Savior" and "Liquid". The album was followed by a successful holiday single, "Drummer Boy", from the 1995 EP Drummer Boy, which reached No. 3 on the Billboard Heatseekers chart.

Between the debut of their self-titled album and their final project with Essential, Greatest Hits (2008), Jars of Clay would release six more studio albums, two major hits albums and the part-studio, part-live album Furthermore: From the Studio, From the Stage (2003). All (except the hits albums) would peak on the Billboard Top Christian Albums charts within the top five positions with If I Left the Zoo (1999) and Redemption Songs (2005) each spending one week at No. 1. The band's sophomore release, Much Afraid (1997) reached No. 2 on the Top Christian Albums charts, but would become the band's highest-charting album on the Billboard 200, reaching the No. 8 spot. Much Afraid was certified platinum by the RIAA in 2000. If I Left the Zoo and Furthermore were certified gold in 2000 and 2005 respectively. Much Afraid, If I Left the Zoo, and The Eleventh Hour (2002), (their second, third, and fourth albums, respectively), each earned a Grammy Award for Best Pop/Contemporary Gospel Album.

After their tenure with Essential ended in 2007, Jars of Clay created their own record label, Gray Matters, on which they released five more albums. Christmas Songs (2008) became their first independent release. The Long Fall Back to Earth (2009) followed, reaching No. 1 on the Top Christian Albums chart and earned the band their eighth Grammy nomination. The Tucker Martine-produced Inland (2013), the band's fourth independent release and eleventh studio album overall, reached No. 2 on the Top Christian Albums charts.
 
Other notable albums include the Grammy-nominated Who We Are Instead (2003), an intimate exploration of the band's Nashville roots in folk and rural Americana, and Good Monsters (2006), the critically acclaimed release that the band described as their "first ever rock record." Good Monsters was named "Album of the Year" by CCM Magazine in its September 2006 issue, praising it as "the most profound album the Christian music community has released in years." In addition to their Grammys, the band earned three GMA Dove Awards for a best album category for The Eleventh Hour, Good Monsters, and The Long Fall Back to Earth.

Jars of Clay has also released video of most of their live recordings, notably 11Live: Jars of Clay in Concert (2002) on DVD and VHS, and digital video released with the four-volume EP series, Live at Gray Matters (2010–11), among other, more limited releases of live video performances.

Albums

Studio albums

Part-studio, part-live albums

Compilation albums

Extended plays

Other albums

Special editions

Singles

Mainstream radio

Christian radio

Contributions

DVDs

Collaborations

References 
Notes

Footnotes

Discography
Discographies of American artists
Christian music discographies
Rock music group discographies